James William "Jim" Holzapfel (born October 9, 1944) is an American Republican Party politician, who serves in the New Jersey State Senate starting on January 10, 2012, representing the 10th legislative district. Before his election to the Senate he had served in the New Jersey General Assembly since 2003.

Early life 
Born in Point Pleasant Beach, New Jersey, Holzapfel is a graduate of Point Pleasant Beach High School. He received a B.A. from Monmouth College in Pre-Law and was awarded a J.D. degree from the Seton Hall University School of Law. He is a resident of Toms River. He is married to Joyce Holzapfel (née Holden) and has two children, Dennis and Jennifer.

Political career 
Holzapfel served as a Trustee of Ocean County College from 1988 to 1994. He was the Ocean County Prosecutor from 1987 to 1992. Holzapfel has been admitted to practice law since 1969 before the New Jersey Supreme Court, the Supreme Court of the United States and the Florida Supreme Court.

New Jersey Assembly 
Following the resignation of Assemblywoman Virginia E. Haines to become the executive director of the New Jersey Lottery, Holzapfel was appointed to fill her seat and took office on August 15, 1994. He was subsequently reelected in the 1994 special election and the regular biennial elections thereafter. He was the Deputy Republican Leader from 2002 to 2003 and was the Assistant Majority Whip from 1998 to 2000.

Committees 
Regulated Professions

New Jersey Senate 
Having announced that he would not run again for office after 20 years in the Senate, Andrew R. Ciesla announced in February 2011 that he would support Holzapfel as his successor. In the November 2011, Holzapfel defeated Democrat Charles Tivenan by a 64%-36% margin.

Committees 
Health, Human Services and Senior Citizens
Transportation
Intergovernmental Relations Commission

Election history

Senate

Assembly

References

External links
Senator Jim Holzapfel's Official Site
Holzapfel's legislative web page, New Jersey Legislature
Official 10th Legislative District website
New Jersey Legislature financial disclosure forms
2011 2010 2009 2008 2007 2006 2005 2004
Jim Holzapfel, Project Vote Smart

1964 births
Living people
Monmouth University alumni
New Jersey lawyers
Republican Party members of the New Jersey General Assembly
Republican Party New Jersey state senators
People from Point Pleasant Beach, New Jersey
People from Toms River, New Jersey
Politicians from Ocean County, New Jersey
Seton Hall University School of Law alumni
21st-century American politicians